America (stylized in uppercase) is the fifth studio album by American rock band Thirty Seconds to Mars, released on April 6, 2018 through Interscope Records. It is their first album in five years, after Love, Lust, Faith and Dreams (2013), as well as their first release for Interscope, following the band's departure from Virgin Records in 2014. It is also the final album by the band to feature lead guitarist Tomo Miličević, who left the band two months after its release.

Produced by frontman Jared Leto alongside Yellow Claw, Zedd, Robopop, and others, the album represents a drastic shift from the experimental compositions of their previous efforts, opting for an electronic and art pop influenced sound. Lyrically, it is a concept album exploring themes such as politics, sex, and fame. The album was promoted with three singles – "Walk on Water", "Dangerous Night", and "Rescue Me" – in addition to the Monolith Tour and an accompanying documentary film, A Day in the Life of America (2019).

The album received polarized reviews from critics. Some commended the conceptual themes, while others felt that they were not fully developed; critics were also divided over the band's change in sound. Upon its release, America debuted at number two on the US Billboard 200, becoming the band's highest entry on the chart, and reached the top five in several other countries.

Background
Thirty Seconds to Mars released their fourth studio album Love, Lust, Faith and Dreams in May 2013. The album, produced by frontman Jared Leto and previous collaborator Steve Lillywhite, marked a shift in the band's musical direction from an alternative rock sound, recognized with A Beautiful Lie (2005) and This Is War (2009), to a more experimental and electronic-influenced sound. The band parted ways with Virgin Records in 2014 after tumultuous years with the label, and later signed with Interscope.

The group began preparations for new music in November 2015, with Leto expressing his desire to experiment and explore new musical grounds. Additionally, Leto started working on the documentary film A Day in the Life of America, which was conceived as a companion piece to the band's fifth album. The film includes user-submitted footage from July 4, 2017, depicting Independence Day in the United States. It was released in January 2021 on PBS after premiering at the 2019 Tribeca Film Festival. The band later embarked on a promotional tour with Muse and PVRIS, which was one of the highest-grossing North American tours of 2017, according to Pollstars annual year-end tour chart.

While touring, Thirty Seconds to Mars announced "Walk on Water" as the lead single from the album. Critics acknowledged a slight political edge in the song's lyrics, inspired by the election of Donald Trump as President of the United States. The song earned the band an MTV Europe Music Award for Best Alternative. While collecting the award, Jared Leto made a remark at Trump's immigration policy as he stated, "We are Americans – a land of immigrants – and we just want to say that we welcome you with open arms and with open hearts, and we love you."

Promotion
America was first announced by the band in February 2018 under a placeholder name, alongside the North American leg of The Monolith Tour. Tickets for the tour, including the previously-announced European leg, were sold with a copy of the album, to be delivered upon its release on April 6, 2018. A presale of tickets were offered to people that had pre-ordered the album before February 12. America was officially unveiled by the band and Interscope Records on March 22, 2018. It was unveiled with an advertising campaign featuring billboards and posters reproducing the album's art direction and design. Billboards were located at landmark locations such as Sunset Boulevard in Los Angeles, New York City's Times Square, and outside of a number of London Underground stations. A listening session for the album took place on April 3 at the Rock and Roll Hall of Fame and Museum in Cleveland.

Singles
On August 22, 2017, Interscope released "Walk on Water" as the lead single promoting the then-unannounced fifth studio album by the band. The song was performed live for the first time at the 2017 MTV Video Music Awards on August 27 with Travis Scott as a special surprise guest. A music video for the song premiered on Vevo on November 8, 2017, featuring footage from the documentary film A Day in the Life of America. "Walk on Water" was used by ESPN as the promotional theme for the network's coverage of the 2017 College Football season.

"Dangerous Night" was released as the second single from the album on January 25, 2018, after it premiered on Zane Lowe's radio show of Beats 1 in London. The band debuted the song live the same day at The Late Show with Stephen Colbert. Their performance was filmed through the use of advanced robotic cameras which changed frame following the beat of the track, and featured an interpretive dancer. Nicholas Rice from Billboard commended the band's performance, praising its visuals and calling it "one-of-a-kind".

"Rescue Me" was released as the third single from the album on June 15, 2018. The official music video premiered three days earlier. On May 27, 2018, the band were joined on stage by Shawn Mendes to perform the song at BBC Music's Biggest Weekend.

Packaging
The art direction and design for the album were handled by Willo Perron and Jared Leto. America features multiple album covers featuring an array of lists of words that reflect the themes of the album, including the most prescribed drugs, iconic American names, the most valuable trademarks, popular sex positions, recognizable abbreviated agencies, most dangerous sports, highest paid YouTubers and generally hot topics of discussion. Thirty Seconds to Mars also launched a custom album cover generator allowing fans to create their own custom lists in the format of the America album cover. Leto explained, "For me the lists are almost like a time capsule. Independently they may surprise, entertain or provoke, but as a group they give us a sense of the culture we are a part of and the times we are living in."

Critical reception

America received polarized reviews from music critics. Many commentators commended the album's conceptual execution, while others believed that its underlying concept was not fully developed. Critics also debated the stylistic change in the band's sound. At Metacritic, which assigns a normalized rating out of 100 to reviews from mainstream critics, the album has an average score of 47 based on four reviews, indicating "mixed or average reviews". Neil Z. Yeung from AllMusic described America as a "bold and risky move" from the band, calling it as "vast and polarizing" as the country after which it is named. Katie Wattendorf, writing for The Cavalier Daily, gave America a positive review, praising the album's concept and calling it "as diverse as the country itself". She commented that the album addresses recent history in the United States not just "by mentioning the political climate, or the violence, or the technology takeover — but by posing a solution in the form of unity through differences, cohesion through variety". Aneta Grulichova from The Music magazine awarded the album four stars out of five and praised the band's stylistic change, noting that the record incorporates a softer sound as well as elements from techno.

Spin'''s Al Shipley, who gave the album a mixed review, felt that the energy and volume found in the band's signature style was replaced with "fairly tame looped and programmed beats and ominous synths", although he praised the song "Rider", describing it as "a rare glimpse at a Thirty Seconds to Mars that's willing to subvert expectations". Both Q and Kerrang! gave America'' a mixed review, with the former calling the album "unsubtle, self-important and not half as good as it thinks it is", while the latter called it "an odd album, one that requires patience to unlock."

Track listing

Personnel
Credits adapted from Qobuz.

 Stevie Aiello – composition 
 ASAP Rocky – composition , vocals 
 Alice Aufray – background vocals 
 Neal Avron – audio mixing 
 William Binderup – mixing assistance 
 Will Borza – mastering assistance
 Scott Desmarais – mixing assistance 
 Tommy English – production 
 Robin Florent – mixing assistance 
 Chris Galland – mix engineering 
 Jordan Galvan – audio mixing 
 Şerban Ghenea – audio mixing 
 Halsey – composition , vocals 
 John Hanes – mixing assistance 
 KillaGraham – composition , production 

 Rob Kinelski – audio mixing 
 Jared Leto – composition , production, art direction, design
 Shannon Leto – composition , vocals 
 Erik Madrid – audio mixing 
 Manny Marroquin – audio mixing 
 Willo Perron & Brian Roettinger;– art direction, design
 Robopop – composition , production 
 Jamie Schefman – production 
 Ryan Shanahan – mixing assistance 
 Scott Skrzynski – mixing assistance 
 Thom Van Der Bruggen – composition 
 Howie Weinberg – audio mastering
 Yellow Claw – composition , production 
 Zedd – production , audio mixing

Charts

Weekly charts

Year-end charts

Certifications

References

External links
 America subsite at Thirty Seconds to Mars

2018 albums
Art pop albums
Thirty Seconds to Mars albums
Concept albums
Interscope Records albums
Political music albums by American artists